Vernon or Vern Smith may refer to:

 Vern Smith (journalist) (1892–?), American left-wing journalist
 Vernon B. Smith (1894–1969), American regional artist
 Vernon Smith (American football) (1908–1988), American football, basketball, and baseball player and coach
 Vernon L. Smith (born 1927), American economist
 Vernon Smith (Indiana politician) (born 1944)
 Vernon Smith (basketball) (1958–1992), American basketball player
 Vern Smith (ice hockey) (born 1964), Canadian ice hockey defenceman
 Vernon K. Smith (died 1966), Idaho politician
 Vernon Smith (screenwriter) (active 1924–1951), writer of American films